The 2006 Chivas USA season was the club's second season of existence, and their second in Major League Soccer, the top flight of American soccer. The club competed in the MLS's Western Conference, where they finished in third place, in their Conference, qualifying for the Playoffs for the first time.

Season review
On November 23, 2005, Chivas appointed Bob Bradley as their new manager.

Transfers

In

Out

Roster

Competitions

MLS

League table

Results summary

Results

MLS Cup Playoffs

U.S. Open Cup

Statistics

Appearances and goals

|-
|colspan="14"|Players away from Chivas USA on loan:
|-
|colspan="14"|Players who left Chivas USA during the season:
|}

Goal scorers

Disciplinary Record

References

Chivas USA seasons
Chivas USA
Chivas USA
Chivas USA